Pure is a Canadian television drama series that first aired on CBC Television in January and February 2017, and subsequently on Super Channel. The show stars Ryan Robbins as Noah Funk, a Mennonite pastor working undercover within an organized crime network in order to clean up a drug trafficking problem in his community. The show also stars A. J. Buckley, Peter Outerbridge, Alex Paxton-Beesley, and Rosie Perez.

Pure is produced by Two East Productions and Cineflix Media and is directed by Ken Girotti.

Showrunner Michael Amo stated that he pitched the show to television networks in the 2000s but "didn't get any takers". It is inspired by the operations of a Mennonite organized crime ring that smuggled cocaine and marijuana from Mexico to Canada and the United States.

The series premiere was watched by 858,000 Canadian viewers. On April 12, 2017, the show was picked up by Hulu in the United States. WGN America acquired the US television rights to the series in August 2017.

Initially, Pure was not renewed for a second season; however, in April 2018 the show was picked up by Super Channel, CBC, Hulu, and WGN America for a season two with six episodes, set to premiere in 2019. The series is scheduled to debut on WGN America on May 28, 2019.

In June 2018, Super Channel announced that actors Alyson Hannigan, Christopher Heyerdahl, Zoie Palmer, and Victor Gomez were joining the production for Season 2.

Cast
The cast includes:
 Ryan Robbins as Noah Funk, a pastor
 Alex Paxton-Beesley as Anna Funk, Noah's wife
 A. J. Buckley as Bronco Novak, a police detective
 Peter Outerbridge as Eli Voss, a gang leader
 Rosie Perez as Phoebe O'Reilly, a DEA agent
 Alyson Hannigan as Esther Dunkel 
 Christopher Heyerdahl as Augustus Nickel
 Zoie Palmer as Valerie Krochack
 Alex Crowther as Johan Fehr
 Gord Rand as Abel Funk

Episodes

Season 1 (2017)

Season 2 (2019)

Setting
Though filmed in Nova Scotia, Pure is set in a fictional town called Antioch in southern Ontario, and during the first season, it also included the U.S. state of Texas and the Mexican state of Chihuahua.

Accolades

References

Further reading

External links

CBC Television original programming
2017 Canadian television series debuts
2010s Canadian crime drama television series
Mennonitism in popular culture
Mennonitism in Canada
Super Channel (Canadian TV channel) original programming
Religious drama television series
Television series by Cineflix